Hjördis Paulina Genberg (10 November 1919 – 24 December 1997) was a Swedish actress and model. She was the second wife of English actor and author David Niven. Genberg was among the first supermodels of Sweden.

Life 
Hjördis Genberg was born on 10 November 1919 in Åsarna, Jämtland county, Sweden. She was the fourth of five children of Gerda Paulina (née Hägglund) and Johan Georg Genberg. Genberg attended high school in the nearby Salsåker, a small town in Nordingrå. 

In 1943, she made her breakthrough as an actress in the film Sjätte skottet. 

She married the businessman Carl-Gustav Tersmeden in 1946. They divorced in 1947. 

In January 1948, Genberg married British actor David Niven, with whom she adopted two daughters, Kristina  and Fiona Niven. According to friends, the relationship between Niven and Hjördis was turbulent.

After 35 years of marriage, Niven died on 29 July 1983 in Château-d’Œx, Switzerland, of ALS.  

In 1994, tabloid newspapers linked her with Prince Ranier of Monaco, however a spokesperson for Rainer said no marriage was in the plans.

Hjördis Genberg died on 24 December 1997, of a brain bleed at age 78 in Céligny, Switzerland. Her ashes were scattered in the Mediterranean Sea.

Filmography (selection) 

 1943: Sjätte skottet
 1943: Fångad av en röst
 1945: Brita i grosshandlarhuset
 1945: 13 stolar

In popular culture 

 Niven, David (2005-04-28). The Moon's a Balloon. Penguin UK. .
 Niven, David (2009-01). Bring on the Empty Horses. Little, Brown Book Group Limited. .
 Lord, Graham (2004-12-14). NIV: The Authorized Biography of David Niven. St. Martin's Press. .
 Munn, Michael (2014-07-10). David Niven: The Man Behind the Balloon. Aurum Press. .

Reference

External links 

 
 Hjordis Genberg biographies

Swedish female models
1919 births
1997 deaths
People from Jämtland County
20th-century Swedish actresses